Round Valley is a valley south of Pinto Mountain within the Mojave National Preserve in San Bernardino County, California.

References 

Mojave National Preserve
Valleys of California
Valleys of the Mojave Desert
Valleys of San Bernardino County, California